Petronio Veroni (2 October 1600 – 11 May 1653) was a Roman Catholic prelate who served as Bishop of Boiano (1652–1653).

Biography
Petronio Veroni was born in Bologna, Italy and ordained a priest in the Order of Saint Augustine.
On 8 January 1652, he was appointed by Pope Innocent X as Bishop of Boiano. On 21 January 1652, he was consecrated bishop by Niccolò Albergati-Ludovisi, Cardinal-Priest of Santa Maria degli Angeli, with Raffaele Pizzorno, Bishop of Sagone, and Giambattista Zeccadoro, Bishop of Fossombrone as co-consecrators. He served as Bishop of Boiano until his death on 11 May 1653.

References

External links and additional sources
 (for Chronology of Bishops) 
 (for Chronology of Bishops) 

1600 births
1653 deaths
17th-century Italian Roman Catholic bishops
Bishops appointed by Pope Innocent X
Augustinian bishops